Archiwum is the second album by the Polish punk rock band WC. The album was released only as a cassette. In 2005, the album was re-released on CD.

Track listing

A side
"Kłamstwo"
"Twoja - Wasza Wojna"
"My Punk Song"
"Nie Chcę Jeszcze Umierać"
"Wy"-liczenia
"...Społeczeństwo"
"Agitator Nr 1"
"T-34"
"Zagłada"
"Dobranoc Dla Wybranych"

B side
 Regulamin
 Ingerencja
 Position
 Zdyscyplinowany Mały, Szary Człowiek
 Czerwone Spódnice
 Młoda Generacja
 Roz MO wa
 Agresja

2005 re-release

Track listing
"Kłamstwo" (en.: A lie)
"Twoja" - Wasza Wojna (en.: Your - Our war)
"My Punk Song" 
"Nie chcę jeszce umierać" (en.: I do not want to die yet)
"Wy-liczenia"
"... Społeczeństwo" (en.: ...society)
"Agitator nr 1"
"T-34"
"Zagłada" (en.: The Doom)
"Dobranoc dla wybranych" (en.: Good-night for the chosen)
"Regulamin" (en.: A regulation)
"Ingerencja" (en.: Interference)
"Position" 
"Zdyscyplinowany, mały, szary człowiek" (en.: Disciplined, small, grey man)
"Czerwone spódnice" (en.: Red skirts)
"Młoda Generacja" (en.: Young generation)
"Roz MO wa"
"Agresja" (en.: The aggression)
"Młoda Generacja" (wersja)

Bonus CD tracks
 "Masturbacja" (live)
 "Łazienka" (live)
 "Walka o przetrwanie" (live)
 "Do domu wrócimy" (live)
 "... Społeczeństwo" (live)
 "Wy-liczenia" (live)
 "Arbeit" (live)
 "Bez sensu" (live)
 "Twoja - Wasza Wojna" (live)
 "Jakoś nie tak" (live)
 "Interwencje" (live)
 "Dobranoc dla wybranych" (live)

Personnel
Leszek Weiss - vocals, guitar
Wiesław Wójtowicz - bass guitar
Janusz T. Gawroński - drums
Maciej Kupiec - drums
Jaromir - vocals

External links
Band's official site 

1997 albums
WC (band) albums